Sebastian Breuer (born 21 February 2003) is an Austrian footballer currently playing as a defender for Juniors OÖ.

Career statistics

Club

Notes

References

2003 births
Living people
Austrian footballers
Austria youth international footballers
Association football defenders
2. Liga (Austria) players
LASK players
FC Juniors OÖ players